Violent Soho is the second official studio album of Violent Soho, released on 9 March 2010 on the Ecstatic Peace label. The album contains much of the material off of their first album, We Don't Belong Here, though it has been re-recorded with changes made to some of the songs. Although the album is not technically their first record, it is commonly referred to as their "debut album".

Track listing

Personnel
 Violent Soho
 Luke Boerdam - lead vocals, rhythm guitars
 James Tidswell - lead guitars
 Luke Henery - bass guitars, backing vocals
 Michael Richards - drums, percussion

ARIA Awards

|-
|rowspan="1"| 2010 ||rowspan="1"| Violent Soho || Best Hard Rock/Heavy Metal Album||

References

2010 albums
Violent Soho albums
Ecstatic Peace! albums